The Totoești is a left tributary of the river Bahlui in Romania. It flows into the Bahlui in Podu Iloaiei.

References

Rivers of Romania
Rivers of Iași County